Ulma is a rural locality (a selo) in Uglovskiy Selsoviet of Mazanovsky District, Amur Oblast, Russia. The population was 116 as of 2018. There are 8 streets.

Geography 
Ulma is located on the left bank of the Ulma River, 62 km northwest of Novokiyevsky Uval (the district's administrative centre) by road. Uglovoye is the nearest rural locality.

References 

Rural localities in Mazanovsky District